In mathematics, the mean curvature  of a surface  is an extrinsic measure of curvature that comes from differential geometry and that locally describes the curvature of an embedded surface in some ambient space such as Euclidean space.

The concept was used by Sophie Germain in her work on elasticity theory. Jean Baptiste Marie Meusnier used it in 1776, in his studies of minimal surfaces. It is important in the analysis of minimal surfaces, which have mean curvature zero, and in the analysis of physical interfaces between fluids (such as soap films) which, for example, have constant mean curvature in static flows, by the Young-Laplace equation.

Definition
Let  be a point on the surface  inside the three dimensional Euclidean space . Each plane through  containing the normal line to  cuts  in a (plane) curve. Fixing a choice of unit normal gives a signed curvature to that curve. As the plane is rotated by an angle  (always containing the normal line) that curvature can vary.

.

By applying Euler's theorem, this is equal to the average of the principal curvatures :

More generally , for a hypersurface  the mean curvature is given as 

More abstractly, the mean curvature is the trace of the second fundamental form divided by n (or equivalently, the shape operator).

Additionally, the mean curvature   may be written in terms of the covariant derivative  as 

using the Gauss-Weingarten relations, where  is a smoothly embedded hypersurface,  a unit normal vector, and  the metric tensor.

A surface is a minimal surface if and only if the mean curvature is zero.  Furthermore, a surface which evolves under the mean curvature of the surface , is said to obey a heat-type equation called the mean curvature flow equation.

The sphere is the only embedded surface of constant positive mean curvature without boundary or singularities.  However, the result is not true when the condition "embedded surface" is weakened to "immersed surface".

Surfaces in 3D space
For a surface defined in 3D space, the mean curvature is related to a unit normal of the surface:

where the normal chosen affects the sign of the curvature. The sign of the curvature depends on the choice of normal: the curvature is positive if the surface curves "towards" the normal. The formula above holds for surfaces in 3D space defined in any manner, as long as the divergence of the unit normal may be calculated. Mean Curvature may also be calculated

where I and II denote first and second quadratic form matrices, respectively.

For the special case of a surface defined as a function of two coordinates, e.g. , and using the upward pointing normal the (doubled) mean curvature expression is

Implicit form of mean curvature
The mean curvature of a surface specified by an equation  can be calculated by using the gradient  and the Hessian matrix

The mean curvature is given by:

Another form is as the divergence of the unit normal.

Mean curvature in fluid mechanics
An alternate definition is occasionally used in fluid mechanics to avoid factors of two:
.

This results in the pressure according to the Young-Laplace equation inside an equilibrium spherical droplet being surface tension times ; the two curvatures are equal to the reciprocal of the droplet's radius 
.

Minimal surfaces

A minimal surface is a surface which has zero mean curvature at all points. Classic examples include the catenoid, helicoid and Enneper surface. Recent discoveries include Costa's minimal surface and the Gyroid.

CMC surfaces

An extension of the idea of a minimal surface are surfaces of constant mean curvature. The surfaces of unit constant mean curvature in hyperbolic space are called Bryant surfaces.

See also
 Gaussian curvature
 Mean curvature flow
 Inverse mean curvature flow
 First variation of area formula
 Stretched grid method

Notes

References
.

Differential geometry
Differential geometry of surfaces
Surfaces
Curvature (mathematics)